Club Deportiu Banyoles is a Spanish football club based in the city of Banyoles, in the autonomous community of Catalonia. Founded in 1913, it plays in Tercera División, holding home games at Estadi Nou Municipal, which has a capacity of 4,000 spectators.

History 
The club was founded on August 15, 1913 by Francesc Xavier Ballestero Pérez.

Season to season
 

24 seasons in Tercera División

Notable players
 Ferran Corominas
 Andreu Fontàs
 Albert Serra
 Chechu

References

External links
Official website

Football clubs in Catalonia
Association football clubs established in 1913
Divisiones Regionales de Fútbol clubs
1913 establishments in Spain